Omladinski košarkaški klub Šabac is a women's basketball club based in Šabac, Serbia. The club currently plays in Women's Serbian League.

Notable former players

External links
 Profile on facebook.com
 Profile on eurobasket.com
 Profile on srbijasport.net

Sabac
Sport in Šabac
Basketball teams established in 1995
1995 establishments in Serbia